José María Silvero (September 21, 1931 – August 2, 2010) was an Argentine professional football defence player and coach. He played with Estudiantes de La Plata (198 matches) and with Boca Juniors (103 matches). He played in the NPSL for the Chicago Spurs in 1967. Upon retirement he managed several teams, most notably Boca Juniors, which he guided to the Nacional 1970 first division title.

Silvero managed other clubs in Argentina: Defensores de Cambaceres (before Boca), Rosario Central, Estudiantes de la Plata, Atlanta, Colón, and Lanús. Outside Argentina he managed Club Sport Emelec in Ecuador, and Unión Española in Chile.

After quitting management, he was the general coordinator of the "Osvaldo Zubeldía" management school in La Plata.

Titles
As player
Second Division 1954 (Estudiantes)
Primera División 1962 (Boca Juniors)
Primera División 1964 (Boca Juniors)
Primera División 1965 (Boca Juniors)

As coach
Nacional 1970 (Boca Juniors)
Second Division 1976 (Lanús)

References

External links

1931 births
2010 deaths
Sportspeople from Corrientes Province
Argentine footballers
Argentine expatriate footballers
Boca Juniors footballers
Estudiantes de La Plata footballers
National Professional Soccer League (1967) players
Chicago Spurs players
Argentine football managers
Boca Juniors managers
Expatriate soccer players in the United States
Argentine expatriate sportspeople in the United States
Expatriate football managers in Chile
Expatriate football managers in Ecuador
Argentine Primera División players
Estudiantes de La Plata managers
Association football defenders
Burials at La Plata Cemetery
Club Atlético Colón managers